{|
{{Infobox ship image
|Ship image=File:Frankfurt (ship, 1915) - NH 2063 - cropped.jpg
|Ship caption=Wiesbadens sister ship Frankfurt
}}

|}SMS Wiesbaden''' was a light cruiser of the  built for the Imperial German Navy (Kaiserliche Marine). She had one sister ship, ; the ships were very similar to the previous s. The ship was laid down in 1913, launched in January 1915, and completed by August 1915. The ship was badly damaged by gunfire from the battlecruiser . Immobilized between the two battle fleets, Wiesbaden became the center of a hard-fought action that saw the destruction of two British armored cruisers. Heavy fire from the British fleet prevented evacuation of the ship's crew. Wiesbaden remained afloat until the early hours of 1 June and sank sometime between 01:45 and 02:45. Only one crew member survived the sinking; the wreck was located by German Navy divers in 1983.

She displaced  at full load. Her propulsion system consisted of two sets of Marine steam turbines driving two  screw propellers. They were designed to give . These were powered by ten coal-fired Marine-type water-tube boilers and two oil-fired double-ended boilers. Wiesbaden had a crew of 17 officers and 457 enlisted men.

The ship was armed with a main battery of eight  SK L/45 guns in single pedestal mounts. Two were placed side by side forward on the forecastle, four were located amidships, two on either side, and two were placed in a superfiring pair aft. They were supplied with 1,024 rounds of ammunition, for 128 shells per gun. The ship's antiaircraft armament initially consisted of four  L/55 guns, though these were replaced with a pair of  SK L/45 anti-aircraft guns. She was also equipped with four  torpedo tubes with eight torpedoes. Two were submerged in the hull on the broadside and two were mounted on the deck amidships. She could also carry 120 mines.

Service historyWiesbaden was ordered under the contract name "Ersatz " and was laid down at the AG Vulcan shipyard in Stettin in 1913 and launched on 20 January 1915, after which fitting-out work commenced. She was commissioned into the High Seas Fleet on 23 August 1915, after being rushed through sea trials.

Battle of Jutland

Commanded by Captain Fritz Reiss, Wiesbaden was assigned to II Scouting Group of light cruisers under Konteradmiral Friedrich Boedicker, which took part in the Battle of Jutland on 30 May and 1 June 1916. Wiesbadens sister ship  served as Boedicker's flagship. The unit was assigned to screen for the battlecruisers of Vizeadmiral Franz von Hipper's I Scouting Group.

At around 18:30, Wiesbaden and the rest of II Scouting Group encountered the cruiser ; they opened fire and scored several hits on the ship. As both sides' cruisers disengaged, Rear Admiral Horace Hood's three battlecruisers intervened. His flagship  scored a hit on Wiesbaden that exploded in her engine room and disabled the ship. Konteradmiral Paul Behncke, the commander of the leading element of the German battle line, ordered his dreadnoughts to cover the stricken Wiesbaden. Simultaneously, the light cruisers of the British 3rd and 4th Light Cruiser Squadrons attempted to make a torpedo attack on the German line; while steaming into range, they battered Wiesbaden with their main guns. The destroyer  steamed to within  of Wiesbaden and fired a single torpedo at the crippled cruiser. It hit directly below the conning tower, but the ship remained afloat. Wiesbaden launched her torpedoes while she remained immobilized, scoring one hit against the battleship .

Shortly after 20:00, III Flotilla of torpedo boats attempted to rescue Wiesbadens crew, but heavy fire from the British battle line drove them off. Another attempt to reach the ship was made, but the torpedo boat crews lost sight of the cruiser and were unable to locate her. The ship finally sank sometime between 01:45 and 02:45. Only one crew member survived the sinking; he was picked up by a Norwegian steamer the following day. Among the 589 killed was the well-known writer of poetry and fiction dealing with the life of fishermen and sailors, Johann Kinau, known under his pseudonym of Gorch Fock, who has since then been honored by having two training windjammers of the Kriegsmarine and the German Navy, respectively, named after him. The wreck of Wiesbaden'' was found in 1983 by divers of the German Navy, who removed both of the ship's screws. The ship lies on the sea floor upside down, and was the last German cruiser sunk at Jutland to be located.

Notes

Footnotes

Citations

References

Further reading
 

Wiesbaden-class cruisers
Ships built in Stettin
1915 ships
World War I cruisers of Germany
Ships sunk at the Battle of Jutland
Maritime incidents in 1916